Chambre Corker was an Anglican priest, most notably Archdeacon of Ardagh from 1778 until his death in 1790.

He was  educated at Trinity College, Dublin. He was for many years the incumbent at Glanmire.

Notes

1790 deaths
Alumni of Trinity College Dublin
18th-century Irish Anglican priests
Archdeacons of Ardagh